"I'm a Player" is a song by American rapper Too Short, released as the lead single from his eighth studio album Get in Where You Fit In (1993). The song was produced by the Dangerous Crew and samples "Hollywood Squares" by Bootsy Collins.

Critical reception
The song has been considered a highlight of Get in Where You Fit In. "NL" praised the song for its "bass line and autobiographical lyrics", citing it as the reason to listen to the album more than once.

Music video
A music video for the song was shot in Oakland, California. Too Short raps at a pool party at his house and driving around town in a Cadillac.

Charts

References

1993 singles
1993 songs
Too Short songs
Jive Records singles
Songs written by Too Short
Songs written by Bootsy Collins
Songs written by George Clinton (funk musician)